Don't Look Back, My Son, also known as My Son, Don't Turn Round in the United States, is a 1956 Croatian film directed by Branko Bauer.

In 1999, a poll of Croatian film critics found it to be the eighth greatest Croatian film ever made.

References

External links

Don't Look Back, My Son at Filmski-Programi.hr 

1956 films
1950s Croatian-language films
Yugoslav war drama films
Films directed by Branko Bauer
Jadran Film films
Croatian black-and-white films
Yugoslav black-and-white films
Croatian war drama films
1950s war drama films